Hibiscus fragilis, the mandrinette, is an extremely rare shrub that is endemic to steep slopes of the mountains Corps de Garde and Le Morne Brabant on Mauritius and from two further plants on Rodrigues. The mandrinette is an evergreen plant with flowers 7–10 cm diameter with five bright pink to carmine red petals.

The mandrinette looks rather similar to the Chinese hibiscus (Hibiscus rosa-sinensis) and the introduction of that to Mauritius as a garden plant is one of the main reasons for the dramatic decline of the mandrinette. Only 46 mature individuals exist in the wild but they are not able to reproduce due to competition from and hybridisation with this invasive Hibiscus species.

There are currently 200 plants in nurseries. Royal Botanic Gardens, Kew is attempting to reproduce seedlings of the species, with the help of Ex-situ conservation, for reintroduction into the wild now that efforts to remove the invasive hibiscus have been successful.

In 1970 Andy Warhol made prints titled "Flowers" of the mandrinette with petals in different colours based on a photograph by the nature photographer Patricia Caulfield, published in the June 1964 issue of the magazine Modern Photography.

References

External links
The Mandrinette as seen by Andy Warhol
Patricia Caulfield's original photo of the Mandrinette flowers painted by Andy Warhol

fragilis
Endemic flora of Mauritius
Critically endangered plants